A line chart or line graph, also known as curve chart, is a type of chart which displays information as a series of data points called 'markers' connected by straight line segments.   It is a basic type of chart common in many fields. It is similar to a scatter plot except that the measurement points are ordered (typically by their x-axis value) and joined with straight line segments.  A line chart is often used to visualize a trend in data over intervals of time – a time series – thus the line is often drawn chronologically. In these cases they are known as run charts.

History
Some of the earliest known line charts are generally credited to Francis Hauksbee, Nicolaus Samuel Cruquius, Johann Heinrich Lambert and William Playfair.

Example 
In the experimental sciences, data collected from experiments are often visualized by a graph. For example, if one collects data on the speed of an object at certain points in time, one can visualize the data in a data table such as the following:

Such a table representation of data is a great way to display exact values, but it can prevent the discovery and understanding of patterns in the values. In addition, a table display is often erroneously considered to be an objective, neutral collection or storage of the data (and may in that sense even be erroneously considered to be the data itself) whereas it is in fact just one of various possible visualizations of the data.

Understanding the process described by the data in the table is aided by producing a graph or line chart of speed versus time. Such a visualisation appears in the figure to the right. This visualization can let the viewer quickly understand the entire process at a glance. 

This visualization can however be misunderstood, especially when expressed as showing the mathematical function  that expresses the speed  (the dependent variable) as a function of time . This can be misunderstood as showing speed to be a variable that is dependent only on time. This would however only be true in the case of an object being acted on only by a constant force acting in a vacuum.

Such misunderstanding of the mathematical concept of something called A being a function of something called B as expressing a causal relationship is however common among laypeople (and reinforced by the term "dependent variable") and is not dependent on representation in a line chart.

Best-fit 

Charts often include an overlaid mathematical function depicting the best-fit trend of the scattered data. This layer is referred to as a best-fit layer and the graph containing this layer is often referred to as a line graph.

It is simple to construct a "best-fit" layer consisting of a set of line segments connecting adjacent data points; however, such a "best-fit" is usually not an ideal representation of the trend of the underlying scatter data for the following reasons:
  
 It is highly improbable that the discontinuities in the slope of the best-fit would correspond exactly with the positions of the measurement values.
 It is highly unlikely that the experimental error in the data is negligible, yet the curve falls exactly through each of the data points.

In either case, the best-fit layer can reveal trends in the data. Further, measurements such as the gradient or the area under the curve can be made visually, leading to more conclusions or results from the data table.

A true best-fit layer should depict a continuous mathematical function whose parameters are determined by using a suitable error-minimization scheme, which appropriately weights the error in the data values. Such curve fitting functionality is often found in graphing software or spreadsheets. Best-fit curves may vary from simple linear equations to more complex quadratic, polynomial, exponential, and periodic curves.

See also
 Curve fitting
 Data and information visualization
 List of information graphics software
 Run chart

References

Quality control tools
Statistical charts and diagrams
Financial charts